Messad (sometimes Messaad) is a town in Algeria. It was the Roman Castellum Dimmidi.

History

During the Roman period it was known as Castellum Dimmidi after the Romans under emperor Septimius Severus seized the settlement. It is unclear if the second part of the name, Dimmidi, was a native name transliterated into Latin, or a new name given by the Romans.

As the Castellum (castle) implies, the settlement was a fortress along the Limes Tripolitanus, the southern border of the province of Numidia. It was a prosperous village and hosted a Roman garrison from roughly 198 to 240 AD.

Messaad has a population of nearly 120,000 inhabitants.

See also

 Castellum Dimmidi

References

Historic Jewish communities in North Africa
Jewish Algerian history
Communes of Djelfa Province
Cities in Algeria
Algeria